Charles Michael Melton (born January 4, 1991) is an American actor and model. He is known for his roles as Reggie Mantle on The CW television series Riverdale and Daniel Bae in the film The Sun Is Also a Star (2019).

Early life
Melton was born on January 4, 1991, in Juneau, Alaska, United States, to Sukyong and Phil Melton. His father is an American with English ancestry, his mother is a Korean emigrant who moved to the U.S. with his father in 1990. Melton is their eldest child. His family moved frequently because his father worked for the military. At one time, he and his family lived in Pyeongtaek, Gyeonggi, South Korea, for about five years. They eventually settled down in Manhattan, Kansas where Melton graduated from Manhattan High School in 2009. Melton studied at nearby Kansas State University, where he played as a defensive back on the football team under coach Bill Snyder. He left school at 20 to pursue acting and moved to Los Angeles, California, in 2012.

He also previously worked as a dog walker on the app Wag.

Career 
He was first successful as a model, having booked gigs for Dolce & Gabbana, Kenneth Cole and MAC. His first acting roles included guest spots on Glee and American Horror Story.

Melton received mainstream attention in 2017 when he was cast as Reggie Mantle in the second season of the CW series Riverdale. He replaced Ross Butler, who left the cast due to his commitment to 13 Reasons Why. After recurring during the second season, Melton officially became a series regular on Riverdale starting with the third season. In 2019, he starred in his first feature film as Daniel Bae in The Sun Is Also a Star, the film adaptation of the book of the same name by Nicola Yoon. Melton is the first Korean-American and Asian-American actor to lead a teen romance film from a major Hollywood studio.

Personal life 
In June 2018, Melton was involved in a controversy over fat shaming tweets he had written in 2011 and 2012. He later apologized, calling the tweets "immature, offensive and inappropriate".

Melton dated  Riverdale co-star Camila Mendes between October 2018 and December 2019.

Filmography

Film

Television

Music videos

References

External links 

Charles Melton on Models.com

1991 births
21st-century American male actors
American male actors of Korean descent
American people of English descent
American people of Korean descent
American male film actors
American male models
American male television actors
American models of Korean descent
American people who self-identify as being of Native American descent
Kansas State University alumni
Living people
People from Juneau, Alaska
People from Manhattan, Kansas